Charaxes cowani is a butterfly in the family Nymphalidae. It is found in eastern Madagascar. The habitat consists of montane forests at altitudes above 1,000 meters.

Full description
A full description is given by Walter Rothschild and Karl Jordan, 1900 Novitates Zoologicae volume 7:287-524.  page 370 (for terms see Novitates Zoologicae volume 5:545-601 )

Taxonomy
Charaxes candiope group. The group members are:

Charaxes candiope
Charaxes antamboulou like next
Charaxes cowani like last
Charaxes velox
Charaxes thomasius

Etymology
Named for Rev William Deans Cowan, missionary author of Geographical Excursions in South Central Madagascar. Royal Geographical Society, London, 1882.

References

Victor Gurney Logan Van Someren, 1974 Revisional notes on African Charaxes (Lepidoptera: Nymphalidae). Part IX. Bulletin of the British Museum of Natural History (Entomology) 29 (8):415-487.

External links
Charaxes cowani images at Charaxes page Consortium for the Barcode of Life
African Butterfly Database Range map via search

Butterflies described in 1878
cowani
Endemic fauna of Madagascar
Butterflies of Africa
Taxa named by Arthur Gardiner Butler